The 2022 Lamborghini Super Trofeo Europe is the fourteenth season of the Lamborghini Super Trofeo Europe. The season will begin on 1 April at Imola and will end on 6 November with the World Final at Portimão, featuring six rounds.

Calendar
The preliminary calendar was released on 7 September 2021, featuring six rounds. In October 2021,  the series promoters announced that Portimão would host the World Final.

Series news
2022 marked the introduction of the Lamborghini Huracán Super Trofeo Evo2, the second evolution of the original Huracán Super Trofeo.

Entry List
All teams use the Lamborghini Huracán Super Trofeo Evo2.

Notes
Jose Hernandez was listed as a competitor driving the #77 car for BDR Competition but ultimately did not make the final entry list for the first race.

References

External links
Official website

Lamborghini Super Trofeo seasons
Lamborghini Super Trofeo Europe